Clypeobarbus bellcrossi, the gorgeous barb, is a species of cyprinid fish native to Africa where it is found in the headwaters of the upper Zambezi River system.  This species can reach a length of  TL.  It can also be found in the aquarium trade.

References

Clypeobarbus
Cyprinid fish of Africa
Fish described in 1965